
Gmina Jedwabne is an urban-rural gmina (administrative district) in Łomża County, Podlaskie Voivodeship, in north-eastern Poland.

Villages
Apart from the town of Jedwabne, Gmina Jedwabne contains the villages and settlements of Bartki, Biczki, Biodry, Biodry-Kolonia, Borawskie, Bronaki-Olki, Bronaki-Pietrasze, Brzostowo, Burzyn, Boguszki Chrostowo, Chyliny, Grabnik, Grądy Małe, Grądy Wielkie, Janczewko, Janczewo, Kąciki, Kaimy, Kajetanowo, Kamianki, Karwowo-Wszebory, Kąty, Koniecki, Konopki Chude, Konopki Tłuste, Korytki, Kossaki, Kotówek, Kotowo Stare, Kotowo-Plac, Kubrzany, Kucze Małe, Kucze Wielkie, Kuczewskie, Lipnik, Makowskie, Mocarze, Nadbory, Nowa Wieś, Nowiny, Olszewo-Góra, Orlikowo, Pawełki, Pieńki Borowe, Pluty, Przestrzele, Rostki, Siestrzanki, Stryjaki, Szostaki and Witynie.

Neighbouring gminas
Gmina Jedwabne is bordered by the gminas of Piątnica, Przytuły, Radziłów, Stawiski, Trzcianne and Wizna.

References

Polish official population figures 2006

Jedwabne
Łomża County